Scott Farquhar (born December 1979) is an Australian billionaire, the co-founder and co-CEO of the software company Atlassian. Farquhar often carries the epithet of accidental billionaire after he and his business partner Mike Cannon-Brookes founded Atlassian with the aim to replicate the 48,000 graduate starting salary typical at corporations without having to work for someone else.

Early life
Farquhar was born in December 1979. He attended James Ruse Agricultural High School and Castle Hill Primary School and graduated from the University of New South Wales, with a Bachelor of Arts and Bachelor of Science.

Career
With Cannon-Brookes, Farquhar is the co-founder and co-CEO of Atlassian, a collaboration software company with more than 51,000 large and small organisations as customers – including some of the biggest names in media, manufacturing and technology – use Atlassian’s tracking, collaboration, communication, service management and development products. Cannon-Brookes and Farquhar were recognised for their achievements as the Australian Consensus IT Professional of the Year award in 2004, and Australian 2006 Entrepreneur of the Year. Farquhar has mentored through the Australian Businesswomen’s Network and gives guest lectures on entrepreneurship to MBA students and undergraduates.

In 2018, Farquhar spoke out against the Australian Government’s renaming of the 457 visas, saying the move damages Australia's reputation as a place that people want to come to work.

Farquar is a significant investor in tech startups through a privately held investment fund, Skip Capital. As of 2021, the fund had a stake in four Australian tech unicorns, including Canva and Airwallex; along with overseas firms, such as Talkdesk, a provider of cloud-based contact centre software based in San Francisco.

Personal life
He is married to Kim Jackson and they have three sons. In 2017 Farquhar purchased from the Fairfax family its former ancestral Sydney harbourside home, Elaine, for approximately 75 million. The  home set on  had been in the ownership of the Fairfax family since 1891 and was vacant for nearly twenty years prior to its purchase by Farquhar. In 2020 it was reported that Farquhar plans a partial knock-down of unsympathetic renovations to Elaine, and rebuild a 30 million contemporary home. In 2018 Cannon-Brookes bought the house next door, Fairwater, Australia's most expensive house at approximately 100 million. In April 2022 Scott saved a man's life in Las Vegas.

Net worth 
Alongside his business partner, Cannon-Brookes, Farquhar debuted on the 2007 BRW Young Rich list of the richest Australians aged 40 and under, and on the BRW Rich 200 in 2013 with an estimated net worth of 250 million. In 2016, his net worth was estimated by Forbes on the list of Australia's 50 Richest people as 1.75 billion; by BRW Rich 200 as 2.00 billion; and by the Sunday Times Rich List as 906 million. , Farquhar was ranked fifth in the Forbes list of Australia's 50 Richest people with a net worth of 6.40 billion. He was ranked fifth on the Financial Review 2021 Rich List with a net worth of 20 billion.

References

1979 births
Living people
Australian billionaires
Australian businesspeople
People educated at James Ruse Agricultural High School
University of New South Wales alumni
Atlassian people